Deni Černi (born 3 May 1993) is a Croatian Paralympic athlete. He won the bronze medal in the men's shot put F33 event at the 2020 Summer Paralympics held in Tokyo, Japan.

References

External links
 

Living people
1993 births
Croatian male shot putters
Athletes (track and field) at the 2020 Summer Paralympics
Medalists at the 2020 Summer Paralympics
Paralympic bronze medalists for Croatia
Paralympic medalists in athletics (track and field)
Paralympic athletes of Croatia
Sportspeople from Virovitica
Medalists at the World Para Athletics European Championships